John Morey Downs (October 10, 1913 – June 6, 1994) was an American child actor, singer, and dancer. He began his career as a child actor, most notably playing Johnny in the Our Gang short series from 1923 to 1926. He remained active in films, television, and theatre up through the early 1960s.

Early life
Downs was born in New York City on October 10, 1913. His father was Lt. Morey Downs, a naval aviator with the U.S. Navy. When he was 8 years old the family moved to San Diego due to his father's transfer. Johnny's mother took him to Hollywood for an audition with the Hal Roach Studios. He appeared in a silent film, then was cast as Johnny in the Our Gang series. He was a regular in the series from 1923 until 1927, appearing in 24 episodes.

Adult career
Outgrowing the Our Gang series at the age of 14, he and fellow Our Gang alumnus Mary Kornman performed on college campuses and the vaudeville circuit, where he polished his singing and dancing skills.

In 1934 he returned to Hollywood and landed a small part in the musical Babes in Toyland. He found his niche in the "college musical" movies of the late 1930s, starting with College Scandal (1935) and College Holiday (1936). With his boy-next-door good looks, he was often cast as a team captain or a cheerleader. Other movie musicals followed, ending in 1944 with What a Man!. He had a notable cameo in the 1945 film Rhapsody in Blue where he  danced to Robert Alda's piano playing of "Swanee". For the remainder of the 1940s and early 1950s he had a few bit parts in films, including Cruisin' Down the River. He spent most of his time on the stage in summer stock and Broadway, scoring a hit in Are You With It?. Altogether he has almost 100 movie credits to his name.

The Johnny Downs Show
In 1949 Downs was co-host of Manhattan Showcase, a 15-minute talent-discovery program on CBS television. He settled in Coronado, California where he sold real estate and became a respected amateur tennis player. From 1953 to 1968 he hosted an after-school kids' television show, The Johnny Downs Show, on Channel 10 (call letters KFSD until 1961, subsequently KOGO). The theme started as an airport hangar with Downs playing a former World War II pilot, "Johnny Jet". Between reruns of The Little Rascals, Downs entertained and informed studio audiences and viewers. Later, it was trains, and he was shown getting off or on a locomotive at the show's beginning and end. As the show changed to feature more Popeye cartoons, his theme changed from being a train engineer to being a boat captain at the San Diego harbor. Since one of the show's sponsors was Golden Arrow Dairy, Downs was regularly featured as a superimposed miniature dancer on top of an old-style milk bottle. Children were welcome to come to the KOGO studio and watch the program being broadcast. When each show concluded, Downs would wave to the viewing room and the visitors would go into the studio. He would let kids put on his coat and cap and mimic his opening "Howdy, howdy, howdy! Good to see ya!  Good to see ya!" There was briefly a morning show where he invited students to come and compete in math quizzes. During this time he appeared as the Tin Woodsman in the San Diego Starlight Opera production of The Wizard Of Oz.

Theater
According to Carleton Carpenter's autobiography, Downs worked as a choreographer in the theater in the late 1950s on a production called Lock Up Your Daughters. He "did our dances, and they were really foolish. It wasn't choreography; I don't know what it was. I do know it wasn't good, and it became a great source of amusement for all the company-- behind Johnny's back, of course, but we were about a subtle as a bus wreck. It bonded the cast completely together."

Death
Downs died of cancer on June 6, 1994, age 80 in Coronado, California. Downs and wife June had five children: Mary, Claudia, John Jr., Mollie and Maureen.

Partial filmography

 Circus Fever (1925, Short) - Johnny
 Dog Days (1925, Short) - Rich Kid
 The Love Bug (1925, Short) - Johnny
 Ask Grandma (1925, Short) - Johnnie
 Thundering Fleas (1926, Short) - Johnny
 45 Minutes from Hollywood (1926, Short) - Himself (archive footage) (uncredited)
 Seeing the World (1927, Short) - Johnny
 Jesse James (1927) - Jesse James as a boy (uncredited)
 Chicken Feed (1927, Short) - Prof. Presto Misterio
 The Valley of the Giants (1927) - Bryce, as a Boy (uncredited)
 The Crowd (1928) - John - Age 12 (uncredited)
 The Trail of '98 (1928) - Mother's Boy
 Babes in Toyland (1934) - Little Boy Blue (uncredited)
 So Red the Rose (1935) - Wounded Yankee Corporal
 College Scandal (1935) - Paul Gedney
 The Virginia Judge (1935) - Bob Stuart
 Coronado (1935) - Johnny Marvin
 Everybody's Old Man (1936) - Tommy Sampson
 The First Baby (1936) - Johnny Ellis
 The Arizona Raiders (1936) - Lonesome Alonzo Q. Mulhall
 Pigskin Parade (1936) - Chip Carson
 College Holiday (1936) - Johnny Jones
 Clarence (1937) - Bobbie
 Turn Off the Moon (1937) - Terry Keith
 Blonde Trouble (1937) - Fred Stevens
 Thrill of a Lifetime (1937) - Stanley
 Algiers (1938) - Pierrot
 Hunted Men (1938) - Frank Martin
 Hold That Co-ed (1938) - Dink
 Swing, Sister, Swing (1938) - Johnny Bennett
 First Offenders (1939) - Fred Gray
 Bad Boy (1939) - John Fraser
 Hawaiian Nights (1939) - Ted Hartley
 Parents on Trial (1939) - Don Martin
 Laugh It Off (1939) - Stephen 'Steve' Hannis
 A Child Is Born (1939) - Johnny Norton
 I Can't Give You Anything But Love, Baby (1940) - Robert Lee 'Bob' Gunther
 Sing, Dance, Plenty Hot (1940) - Johnny
 Melody and Moonlight (1940) - Danny O'Brian
 Slightly Tempted (1940) - Jimmy Duncan
 Honeymoon for Three (1941) - Chester T. Farrington III
 Adam Had Four Sons (1941) - David Stoddard (older)
 Redhead (1941) - Ted Brown
 Sing Another Chorus (1941) - Andy Peyton
 Moonlight in Hawaii (1941) - Pete Fleming
 All-American Co-Ed (1941) - Bob Sheppard / Bobbie DeWolfe
 Freckles Comes Home (1942) - 'Freckles' Winslow
 The Mad Monster (1942) - Tom Gregory
 Behind the Eight Ball (1942) - Danny
 Adventures of the Flying Cadets (1943, Serial) - Cadet Danny Collins
 Campus Rhythm (1943) - 'Scoop' Davis
 Harvest Melody (1943) - Tommy Nelson
 What a Man! (1944) - Henry M. Burrows
 Trocadero (1944) - Johnny Edwards
 Twilight on the Prairie (1944) - Bucky
 Forever Yours (1945) - Ricky
 Rhapsody in Blue (1945) - Dancer
 The Kid from Brooklyn (1946) - Master of Ceremonies
 Square Dance Jubilee (1949) - Himself
 Hills of Oklahoma (1950) - Square Dance Caller
 Call Me Madam (1953) - Cameraman (uncredited)
 The Girls of Pleasure Island (1953) - Marine (uncredited)
 Column South (1953) - Lt. Posick
 Cruisin' Down the River (1953) - Young Jack
 The Caddy (1953) - Shipping Clerk (uncredited)
 Here Come the Girls (1953) - Bob (uncredited) (final film role)

Broadway credits

Hold It!  (1948)
Are You With It? (1945–1946)
Ragged Army (1934)
Growing Pains (1933)
Strike Me Pink (1933)

References

Bibliography
 John Holmstrom, The Moving Picture Boy: An International Encyclopaedia from 1895 to 1995, Norwich, Michael Russell, 1996, p. 60.
 Carleton Carpenter The Absolute Joy of Work: From Vermont to Broadway, Hollywood, and Damn Near 'Round the World, United States, Bear Manor Media, 2016, p. 203.

External links

 
 
 

American male child actors
Male actors from New York (state)
Male actors from San Diego
People from Brooklyn
Vaudeville performers
Deaths from cancer in California
1913 births
1994 deaths
20th-century American male actors
Burials in California
American male comedy actors
Hal Roach Studios actors
Our Gang